Club Daze Volume 1: The Studio Sessions is a compilation album of Twisted Sister's early studio recordings from music tracks dating back to 1978 to 1981. It was released in 1999 and re-issued in 2001.

Track listing
All songs written by Dee Snider, unless otherwise noted

"Come Back" - 6:30   
"Pay the Price" - 4:28
"Rock 'n' Roll Saviors" - 4:37
"High Steppin'" - 2:45
"Big Gun" - 4:02
"T.V. Wife" (Jay Jay French) - 4:01
"Can't Stand Still" (French) - 3:45
"Follow Me" (French) - 3:52
"Lady's Boy" - 4:20
"I'll Never Grow Up, Now" - 4:11
"Leader of the Pack" (Ellie Greenwich, Shadow Morton, Jeff Barry)- 3:54
"Under the Blade" - 4:29
"Shoot 'Em Down" - 3:43

Tracks 1-8 are studio recordings from 1978, tracks 9-12 from 1979, track 13 from 1981

Additional track information: 
 "Come Back" and "Rock 'n' Roll Saviors" were re-recorded and re-released on Still Hungry in 2004.
 A demo snippet of "Pay the Price" was released on the 25th anniversary edition of Stay Hungry in 2009.
 "Lady's Boy" was originally released on the single Bad Boys (of Rock 'n' Roll) in 1980.
 "I'll Never Grow Up, Now" was originally released on the single I'll Never Grow Up, Now in 1979, although the version here is remixed and about 15 seconds longer than original single version.
 These versions of "Leader of the Pack", "Under the Blade" and "Shoot 'Em Down" were originally released on the EP Ruff Cuts in 1982, but they have slighty different mixes than the EP versions and in case of "Under the Blade" and "Shoot 'Em Down" they are about ten seconds shorter than the versions on Ruff Cuts.

Personnel
Dee Snider - vocals
Jay Jay French - guitars, backing vocals
Eddie Ojeda - guitars, backing vocals
Kenneth Harrison Neill - bass on tracks 1-8
Mark Mendoza - bass on tracks 9-13
Tony Petri - drums on track 1-12
Denny McNearney - digital mastering

References

Twisted Sister albums
1999 compilation albums
Spitfire Records compilation albums